17β-Hydroxysteroid dehydrogenase 2 (17β-HSD2) is an enzyme of the 17β-hydroxysteroid dehydrogenase (17β-HSD) family that in humans is encoded by the HSD17B2 gene.

Function
17β-HSD2 is involved in inactivation of androgens and estrogens, being accurately describable as "antiandrogenic" and "antiestrogenic", and is the key 17β-HSD isozyme in androgen and estrogen inactivation. In addition to 17β-HSD activity, this enzyme also shows high 20α-hydroxysteroid dehydrogenase activity and can activate the weak progestogen 20α-hydroxyprogesterone into the potent progestogen progesterone.

Expression
17β-HSD2 is widely expressed throughout the body including in the placenta, liver, intestines, endometrium, kidney, pancreas, breast, prostate, bone, and many other tissues.

Clinical significance
Polymorphisms in HSD17B2 have been associated with breast cancer and prostate cancer. 17β-HSD2 activity has also been associated with endometriosis and osteoporosis, and inhibitors of the enzyme are of potential interest in the treatment of the latter condition. Inactivating mutations resulting in a syndrome of congenital deficiency of 17β-HSD2 have not been reported to date.

References

Further reading